The Corporative Chamber was one of the two parliamentary chambers established under the Portuguese Constitution of 1933, the other being the National Assembly. Unlike the directly elected National Assembly, it had a purely consultative, rather than legislative role.

The creation of the Corporative Chamber was part of corporatist philosophy advocated by Salazar and adopted by the Estado Novo. Its function was to represent the various economic, cultural, social, and other corporations.

The Corporative Chamber met in the former Senate chamber of the São Bento Palace. It was composed of members elected by the various types of Portuguese corporations, including:

Provinces and Municipalities;
Universities and Schools;
Trade Unions;
Economic Organizations and Employers;
Social Welfare Organizations.

Presidents
The presidents of the Corporative Chamber were the following from 1935 to 1974:

See also
Chamber of Fasces and Corporations

External links
Latin fascist elites: the Mussolini, Franco, and Salazar regimes, Paul Lewis, 2002
A history of fascism, 1914-1945, Stanley G. Payne, 1996

References and footnotes

Defunct upper houses
Political history of Portugal
20th century in Portugal
Corporatism